Marcel Wanders (2 July 1963) is a Dutch designer, and art director in the Marcel Wanders studio in Amsterdam, who designs architectural, interior and industrial projects.

Life 
Born in Boxtel, Wanders graduated cum laude from the Hogeschool voor de Kunsten Institute of the Arts Arnhem in 1988 after being expelled from the Design Academy Eindhoven.

In 2000 he opened his studio in Amsterdam, gaining attention in 1996 with his Knotted Chair, which paired high tech materials with ‘low tech’ production methods. In 2001, with Casper Vissers, Wanders founded the design company Moooi, of which he is co-owner and art director. In 2014 in Wanders works as product and interior designer and art director work in his Powerhouse studio with around 50 international design specialists. They have realized over 1700+ projects for private clients and premium brands such as Alessi, Louis Vuitton, Bacarrat, Bisazza, Cappellini, KLM, Swarovski, Puma, among others. Julie Scelfo, writing for The New York Times in 2011 described Wanders as "the Lady Gaga of the design world" for being unconventional, creative and full of energy. Many of his designs humanism and historical influences with innovative materials.

Wanders received various design prizes, including the Rotterdam Design Prize and the Kho Liang Ie Prize. He has lectured at the San Francisco Museum of Modern Art, Limn, the Design Academy, Nike, IDFA, FutureDesignDays and at many of the world's most prestigious design academies. In July 2002 Business Week selected Marcel Wanders as one of Europe's ’25 leaders of change’. Wanders is an advisory board member of THNK School of Creative Leadership.

Work 

Multi-layered interior projects have become increasingly important in Marcel's work  Notable projects to date include interior architecture for such as the Andaz Amsterdam Prinsengracht, Kameha Grand hotel in Bonn, the Mondrian South Beach hotel in Miami, Quasar Istanbul Residences, and the Villa Moda flagship store in Bahrain, as well as private residences in Amsterdam and Mallorca.

In 2015, he was tapped by Revolution Precrafted to design a prefabricated house which he named Eden.

Many of Marcel Wanders' designs have been selected for design collections and exhibitions and feature in magazines. In 2006 he was elected International Designer of the Year by Elle Decoration. Marcel Wanders’ first solo-exhibition, ‘Daydreams,’ in 2009, featured in the Philadelphia Museum

Notable Projects 

 Knotted Chair (1996)
 Egg Vase (1997)
 Amsterdam Gay Games participants medal (1998)
 Snotty Vase (2001)
 V.I.P. Chair (2000)
 Carbon Chair (2004)
 Crochet Chubby Low Armchair (2006)
 Skygarden S1 (2007)
 Westerhuis, Amsterdam, Netherlands (2008)
 Mondrian South Beach, Miami, Florida, United States (2008)
 Villa Moda, Bahrain, (2009)
 Casa Son Vida, Palma, Mallorca, Spain (2009)
 Kameha Grand, Bonn, Germany (2009)
 COSME DECORTE 'AQMW' (Absolute Quality Miracle Wonder) Skin Care (2010)
 Monster Chair (2010)
 Tableware for KLM (2011)
 'Dressed' tableware for Alessi (2011)
 Cosme Decorte 'AQMW' Absolute Quality Miracle Wonder)Makeup (2012)
 Andaz Amsterdam Prinsengracht, Amsterdam, Netherlands (2012)
 Kameha Grand Zurich  (2015)
 Chaise Longue (2015)
 Alessi Circus for Alessi (2016)
 Le Roi Soleil for Baccarat (2016)
 Jardin d’Eden Lighting Collection for Christofle (2016)
 Iberostar Portal Nous (2017)
 Mondrain Doha (2017)
‘Rocking Chair’ and ‘Diamond Screen’ for Louis Vuitton Objets Nomades Collection (2017)
 Quasar Istanbul, Istanbul, Turkey (on-going)
 RAMUN Bella (In Collaboration with Alessandro Mendini, 2019)-2022 Best lighting of the year.

Marcel Wanders 
Marcel Wanders is a product and interior design studio located in Amsterdam, with clients and brands such as Alessi, Baccarat, Bisazza, Christofle, KOSÉ/Cosme Decorté, Flos, KLM, Hyatt, LAUFEN, LH&E Group, Louis Vuitton, Miramar Group, Moooi, Morgans Hotel Group, Puma, Swarovski among others.

Moooi 
In 2001, Marcel Wanders co-founded the design label Moooi, in which he has a three-fold role; he acts as owner, art director and product designer for the company.

Publications
 Wanders Wonders: Design for a New Age (1999) 
 Marcel Wanders: Behind The Ceiling (2009) 
 Marcel Wanders: Interiors (2011) 
 Marcel Wanders: Pinned Up 25 Years of Design (2013))

References

External links

 Marcel Wanders Studio
 Marcel Wanders's Skygarden S1
 Video portrait of Marcel Wanders (Dutch Profiles)
 LUX Magazine Marcel Wanders - The Dutch Wanderer

1963 births
Living people
Design Academy Eindhoven alumni
Dutch furniture designers
Dutch industrial designers
People from Boxtel
Dutch artists